Gräfin Dubarry is an operetta in three acts by Carl Millöcker to a German libretto by F. Zell and Richard Genée. The story concerns Madame du Barry, the mistress of Louis XV, King of France.

Performance history
The operetta had its premiere on 31 October 1879 at the Theater an der Wien, Vienna.

Die Dubarry
This was first given at the Admiralspalast in Berlin on 14 August 1931. According to Andrew Lamb, the production introduced "alien structures and orchestration" compared with the original. This was filmed as The Loves of Madame Dubarry in 1935, and as The Dubarry toured the UK in 1932 starring Binnie Hale and opened at Her Majesty's Theatre on 14 April 1932 with Anny Ahlers, Helen Haye and Mimi Crawford. An EP was released by Anny Ahlers with the songs "I Give My Heart", "The Dubarry", "Beauty", "Happy Little Jeanne" and "Today". An adaptation arranged by Theo Mackeben with additional numbers by Alan Melville and Charles Zwar opened at the Princes Theatre in London on 8 October 1947, starring Irene Manning as Jeanne heading a cast which also featured Ada Reeve as Mme Sauterelle and John Le Mesurier as Comte Lamond. This production ran for just 45 performances.

Roles

Synopsis

The story is set in Paris and Versailles in 1764.

Film versions 
After the 1935 British film The Loves of Madame Dubarry, a German film version The Dubarry was made in Germany in 1951 by Georg Wildhagen, with  Sári Barabás, Mathieu Ahlersmeyer, Willy Fritsch, Albert Lieven and Walter Müller.

See also
Der Bettelstudent
Gasparone

References

External links

Operas by Carl Millöcker
German-language operettas
Operas set in France
1879 operas
Operas adapted into films
Cultural depictions of Louis XV
Cultural depictions of Madame du Barry